Ola Ray (born August 26, 1960) is an American actress and model most notable for her role as the girlfriend of Michael Jackson in the music video Thriller.

Career

Ray modeled for Playboy and was the Playmate of the Month for the June 1980 issue.

Ray complained in the past about difficulties collecting royalties from her participation in Thriller. At first, Ray blamed Michael Jackson. She ultimately sued Jackson in May 2009 in a dispute to obtain uncollected royalties. Jackson died less than two months later on June 25 at age 50, after suffering cardiac arrest. In 2012, the Estate of Michael Jackson settled the lawsuit.

Filmography

Film

Television

Music videos

See also
 List of people in Playboy 1980–1989

References

External links
 
 

1960 births
1980s Playboy Playmates
20th-century American actresses
21st-century American actresses
Actresses from St. Louis
African-American actresses
African-American female models
African-American Playboy Playmates
American film actresses
American television actresses
Female models from Missouri
Living people
20th-century African-American women
20th-century African-American people
21st-century African-American women
21st-century African-American people